The Salara are a Punjabi tribe, found mainly in Chiniot District of Punjab, Pakistan.

References

Punjabi tribes